Two ships in the United States Navy have been named USS Conner for David Conner.

Sources

United States Navy ship names